The coat of arms of the King of Spain is the heraldic symbol representing the monarch of Spain. The current version of the monarch's coat of arms was adopted in 2014 but is of much older origin. The arms marshal the arms of the former monarchs of Castile, León, Aragon, and Navarre.

Traditionally, coats of arms did not belong to a nation but to the monarch who would quarter his shield with territorial claims of his dynasty. Formerly, the Spanish monarch's arms were much more complex than they are today, featuring the arms of the various territories of this dynasty. A simpler version of these arms, known as the lesser arms, was also used; The lesser arms were another set of arms within the centre of the full arms. During the later part of the Bourbon dynasty, this was quarterly Castile and León.

In 1868, during the provisional government that followed the overthrow of Queen Isabella II, an arms of national character was adopted; This 1868 arms created the present-day arrangement of elements in the shield. The "national arms" and "royal arms" coexisted after the restoration of the monarchy. In 1931, the "national arms" were revised into the royal arms, replacing the former lesser arms of the King (i.e. quarterly Castile and León). The monarchy was abolished later that year.

When Juan Carlos, grandson of Alfonso XIII (the last king of Spain), was chosen to be the successor of General Francisco Franco, the arms adopted for his use in 1971 as Prince of Spain was quarterly Castile, Leon, Aragon, and Navarre. The heraldic achievement also included the collar of the Order of the Golden Fleece, the Cross of Burgundy and the yoke and bundle of arrows formerly used by the Catholic Monarchs, the same arms he would use as King. Upon Felipe VI's ascension to the throne in 2014, the cross, yoke, and arrows were dropped from the royal arms.

Blazon
The blazoning of the coat of arms of the King of Spain is set out in Royal Decree 527/2014, 20 June, an amendment to Title II of Spanish Royal Decree 1511/1977 adopting Flags, Standards, Guidons, Insignia and Emblems Regulation. The coat of arms was adopted when King Felipe VI was enthroned as King of Spain.

The shield is divided into four-quarters, blazoned as follows:

1st, gules a castle or, triple-embattled and voided gate and windows, with three towers each triple-turreted, of the field, masoned sable and ajoure azure, which is for Castile;
2nd, argent a lion rampant purpure crowned or, langued and armed, of the second, which is for León;
3rd, or, four pallets gules, which is for Aragon;
4th, gules a cross, saltire and orle of chains linked together or, a centre point vert, which is for Navarre;

Argent enté en point, with a pomegranate proper seeded gules, supported, sculpted and leafed in two leaves vert, which is for Granada.

Inescutcheon azure bordure gules, three fleurs-de-lys or, which is for Bourbon-Anjou.

All surrounded by the collar of the Golden Fleece and crowned with a crown of the same metal and precious stones, with eight rosettes, five visible, and eight pearls interspersed, closed at the top by eight diadems also adorned with pearls and surmounted by a cross on a globe, which is the royal crown of Spain.

In 1969, General Francisco Franco appointed Juan Carlos I as his "successor to the Headship of the Spanish state with the title of King" but gave him the new title of Prince of Spain instead of the traditional title of Prince of Asturias. From 1971 to 1975, Juan Carlos as Prince of Spain used a coat of arms which was virtually identical to the one later adopted when he became King in 1975. Earlier coat of arms differed only that it featured the royal crown of a Crown Prince of Spain, the King's royal crown has eight half-arches of which five are visible, while the Prince's one has only four half-arches of which three are visible. Joined to the shield was the red saltire of Burgundy and, to the dexter and sinister of the base point, the yoke gules in its natural position with ribbons, of the field, and the sheaf of five arrows gules with the arrowheads inverted and ribbons, of the field, which used to be the symbol of the Catholic Monarchs of Spain.

Since June 2014, Juan Carlos's son, Felipe VI, has been using the same arms but without the cross of Burgundy, yoke and arrows. King Juan Carlos's arms include a red lion instead of the purple one displayed on the current version

Variants

Ornamented versions of the historical royal coats of arms

See also

Coat of arms of the Prince of Asturias
Coat of arms of the Prince of Spain
Royal Standard of Spain

References

External links
 Description of the Standard and Coat of arms of the King at Flags of the World
 Origins and History of the Spanish coat of arms 

King of Spain
Spain
King of Spain
Spanish monarchy
Spain
Spain
Spain
Spain
Spain
Spain
Spain, King